Verdelle Smith is an American pop singer who was a one-hit wonder with the song "Tar and Cement" in 1966, an adaptation of the Italian massive hit "Il ragazzo della via Gluck" from Adriano Celentano. She currently lives in Brooklyn, New York.

Selective discography

Singles
Issued on Capitol Records in the United States. Some also on Capitol in Canada and Australia; EMI in the UK; Peak Records in New Zealand.

"(Alone) In My Room" was originally a Spanish song written by Joaquin Pieto, and was later recorded by the Walker Brothers on their second LP, Portrait (1966); by Nancy Sinatra, also in 1966, for her debut album Boots; Willie and the Walkers (#40 in Canada, Jan.1968); and by Marc and the Mambas for their 1983 album Torment and Toreros. The English lyrics were also written by Pockriss and Vance.
"Oh How Much I Love You"
"Tar and Cement": Verdelle Smith recorded "Tar and Cement", an English-language version of the 1966 Italian song "Il ragazzo della via Gluck" by singer Adriano Celentano. Her English version was written by Lee Pockriss and Paul Vance. "Tar and Cement" made it to No. 2 in Australia and to No. 38 in the United States It was also No.6 on "Keener 13" from Detroit radio station WKNR for the week ending June 27, 1966. In Canada, it reached #32.
"I Don't Need Anything", which was later a minor UK hit in 1967 for Sandie Shaw.
"If You Can't Say Anything Nice About Me"
"Baby, Baby" / "There's So Much Love All Around Me"
"Life Goes On" / "Juanito"
"Carnaby's Gone Away" / "Sittin' and Waitin'"
"There`s so much love all around me"

Albums
(Alone) In My Room, Capitol Records, 1966. Produced by Marvin Holtzman, arranged by Lee Pockriss.
Tar and Cement—The Complete Recordings 1965–1967, Omni Recordings, 2013.

References

External links
 
 

21st-century African-American women singers
American women pop singers
Living people
Year of birth missing (living people)